Electoral district of Dundas may refer to:
Division of Dundas, a former electorate of the Australian House of Representatives
Electoral district of Dundas (Victoria), a former electorate of the Victorian Legislative Assembly
Electoral district of Dundas (Western Australia), a former electorate of the Western Australian Assembly